Antonio Vivaldi wrote a set of flute concertos, Op. 10, that were published c. 1728 by Amsterdam publisher Michel-Charles Le Cène.

Flute Concerto No. 1 "La tempesta di mare" in F major, RV 433
 Allegro
 Largo 
 Presto 

Flute Concerto No. 2 "La notte" in G minor, RV 439 (also RV 104, composed in the 1710s with chamber accompaniment)
 Largo
 Presto (Fantasmi) 
 Largo 
 Presto 
 Largo (Il sonno) 
 Allegro 

Flute Concerto No. 3 "Il gardellino" in D major, RV 428
 Allegro
 Cantabile
 Allegro

Flute Concerto No. 4 in G major, RV 435
 Allegro
 Largo
 Allegro

Flute Concerto No. 5 in F major, RV 434
 Allegro ma non tanto
 Largo e cantabile
 Allegro 

Flute Concerto No. 6 in G major, RV 437
 Allegro
 Largo
 Allegro

Note

External links

1728 compositions
Concertos by Antonio Vivaldi
Vivaldi 10
Compositions in F major
Compositions in G minor
Compositions in D major
Compositions in G major